The 2013 Thailand Open Grand Prix Gold was the sixth grand prix gold and grand prix tournament of the 2013 BWF Grand Prix Gold and Grand Prix. The tournament was held in Nimibutr Stadium, Bangkok, Thailand June 4 until June 9, 2013 and had a total purse of $120,000.

Men's singles

Seeds

  Boonsak Ponsana (final)
  Tommy Sugiarto (first round)
  Tanongsak Saensomboonsuk (first round)
  Dionysius Hayom Rumbaka (second round)
  Ajay Jayaram (second round)
  Rajiv Ouseph (quarter-final)
  Hsu Jen-hao (quarter-final)
  Sourabh Varma (second round)
  Tan Chun Seang (third round)
  Anand Pawar (third round)
  Ville Lang (first round)
  Brice Leverdez (first round)
  Srikanth Kidambi (champion)
  Scott Evans (first round)
  Suppanyu Avihingsanon (first round)
  Andre Kurniawan Tedjono (third round)

Finals

Top half

Section 1

Section 2

Section 3

Section 4

Bottom half

Section 5

Section 6

Section 7

Section 8

Women's singles

Seeds

  Saina Nehwal (quarter-final)
  Ratchanok Inthanon (champion)
  Porntip Buranaprasertsuk (quarter-final)
  Pai Hsiao-ma (semi-final)
  Sapsiree Taerattanachai (quarter-final)
  Nichaon Jindapon (quarter-final)
  Busanan Ongbumrungpan (final)
  Gu Juan (semi-final)

Finals

Top half

Section 1

Section 2

Bottom half

Section 3

Section 4

Men's doubles

Seeds

  Mohd Zakry Abdul Latif / Mohd Fairuzizuan Mohd Tazari (quarter-final)
  Vladimir Ivanov / Ivan Sozonov (final)
  Markis Kido / Alvent Yulianto (quarter-final)
  Gan Teik Chai / Ong Soon Hock (first round)
  Shin Baek-cheol / Yoo Yeon-seong (champion)
  Maneepong Jongjit / Nipitphon Puangpuapech (quarter-final)
  Chris Adcock / Andrew Ellis (semi-final)
  Chris Langridge / Peter Mills (semi-final)

Finals

Top half

Section 1

Section 2

Bottom half

Section 3

Section 4

Women's doubles

Seeds

  Duanganong Aroonkesorn / Kunchala Voravichitchaikul (quarter-final)
  Pia Zebadiah / Rizki Amelia Pradipta (first round)
  Lee So-hee / Shin Seung-chan (first round)
  Lam Narissapat / Saralee Thoungthongkam (second round)
  Choi Hye-in / Eom Hye-won (second round)
  Wang Rong / Zhang Zhibo (withdrew)
  Ko A-ra / Yoo Hae-won (semi-final)
  Greysia Polii / Nitya Krishinda Maheswari (champion)

Finals

Top half

Section 1

Section 2

Bottom half

Section 3

Section 4

Mixed doubles

Seeds

  Sudket Prapakamol / Saralee Thoungthongkam (first round)
  Markis Kido / Pia Zebadiah (champion)
  Anders Kristiansen / Julie Houmann (second round)
  Riky Widianto / Richi Puspita Dili (final)
  Shin Baek-cheol / Jang Ye-na (first round)
  Chris Adcock / Gabrielle White (first round)
  Danny Bawa Chrisnanta / Vanessa Neo Yu Yan (quarter-final)
  Tan Aik Quan / Lai Pei Jing (quarter-final)

Finals

Top half

Section 1

Section 2

Bottom half

Section 3

Section 4

References

Thailand Open (badminton)
Thailand Open
Thailand Open Grand Prix Gold
Badminton, Grand Prix Gold, Thailand Open
Badminton, Grand Prix Gold, Thailand Open
Badminton, Grand Prix Gold, Thailand Open